Nailya Faizrakhmanovna Gilyazova (born 2 January 1953) is a Soviet fencer. She won a gold medal in the women's team foil event at the 1976 Summer Olympics and a silver in the same event at the 1980 Summer Olympics.

References

External links
 

1953 births
Living people
Russian female foil fencers
Soviet female foil fencers
Olympic fencers of the Soviet Union
Fencers at the 1976 Summer Olympics
Fencers at the 1980 Summer Olympics
Olympic silver medalists for the Soviet Union
Olympic medalists in fencing
Sportspeople from Kazan
Medalists at the 1976 Summer Olympics
Medalists at the 1980 Summer Olympics